"The New Style" (also known as "It's the New Style") is a song by American rap rock group the Beastie Boys, released as the third single from their debut album Licensed to Ill.

The famous "mmm...drop" line from the song was later sampled in other hip hop songs, including The Pharcyde's "Drop" (1995), OutKast's "Benz or a Beamer", and by the Beastie Boys themselves on their single "Intergalactic" (1998). Furthermore, the opening line was sampled on the tracks "Workinonit" and "The New" by J Dilla, the original mix of "Check Yo Self" by Ice Cube using the phrase "check it" in the chorus, and by the Beastie Boys again on their song "Johnny Ryall" (1989). The "kick it" chorus was sampled at the end of Sublime's "Let's Go Get Stoned". LFO used the line "I'll steal your honey like I stole your bike" in their 1999 hit "Summer Girls". Hip hop group Odd Future also used the instrumental from Big Tuck's "Not A Stain On Me" -- which samples "The New Style" -- on the song "Swag Me Out," off their mixtape Radical. Its recent use of the song was sampled in "Carousel" by Travis Scott from the album Astroworld (2018).

Samples 
"2-3 Break" by The B-Boys
"Drop the Bomb" by Trouble Funk
"Peter Piper"  by Run-D.M.C.

Charts

References

Beastie Boys songs
1986 songs
Song recordings produced by Rick Rubin
Songs written by Rick Rubin
Def Jam Recordings singles
Songs written by Ad-Rock
Songs written by Mike D
Songs written by Adam Yauch